Valeri Milev (born 3 November 1974) is a commercial, music video, and movie director from Sofia, Bulgaria, his most notable works being the movies Bullets of Justice and Re-Kill.

Biography 
Milev attended New Bulgarian University, and graduated in 1999, majoring in Cinema and TV directing. Milev has directed over 200 music videos and 150 TV commercials. His first movie as director was released in 2009, "Re-Kill".

Filmography

References

External links 

1974 births
Living people
Bulgarian film directors
Film people from Sofia